The 1981–82 I-Divisioona season was the eighth season of the I-Divisioona, the second level of Finnish ice hockey. 10 teams participated in the league, and JYP Jyväskylä and FoPS Forssa qualified for the promotion/relegation round of the SM-liiga.

Regular season

Playoffs

Final round
 Vaasan Sport - SaPKo Savonlinna 2:0 (8:2, 5:4)
 JYP Jyväskylä - JoKP Joensuu 2:1 (7:5, 4:5, 4:3)

Second round 
 HPK Hämeenlinna - JYP Jyväskylä 0:3 (3:5, 3:6, 1:3)
 FoPS Forssa - Vaasan Sport 3:2 (3:2, 5:7, 11:1, 1:4, 10:4)

External links
 Season on hockeyarchives.info

I-Divisioona seasons
2
Fin